Where the Sun Never Shines: A History of America's Bloody Coal Industry  is a 1989 history book by Priscilla Long. The text covers the Coal Wars, in particular the 1913-14 Colorado Coalfield War and Ludlow Massacre.

Bibliography 

 
 
 
 
 
 
 
 
 
 
 
 
 
 
 
 
 
 
 

1989 non-fiction books
English-language books
Books about labor history
Coal in the United States